Smartwings Poland Sp. z o.o., formerly Travel Service Polska Sp. z o.o., is a Polish charter airline based in Warsaw. The airline commenced operations in May 2012 from Warsaw Chopin Airport, and is a subsidiary airline of Czech airline Smartwings. As part of a rebranding exercise in 2018, Smartwings Poland, along with other companies in the Travel Service group, had their name changed from Travel Service to Smartwings and their aircraft repainted.

Destinations
Smartwings Poland serves the following leisure destinations:

Africa
Egypt
Sharm el-Sheikh - Sharm el-Sheikh International Airport
Morocco
Agadir - Agadir–Al Massira Airport
Tunisia
Enfidha - Enfidha–Hammamet International Airport
Tanzania
Zanzibar - Abeid Amani Karume International Airport

Asia
Israel
Tel Aviv - Ben Gurion International Airport
Turkey
Antalya - Antalya Airport
Bodrum - Milas–Bodrum Airport
Thailand
Krabi - Krabi International Airport

Europe
Albania
Tirana - Tirana Airport

Bulgaria
Burgas - Burgas Airport
Varna - Varna Airport

Croatia
Split - Split Airport

Cyprus
Larnaca - Larnaca International Airport

Greece
Heraklion - Heraklion International Airport 
Kavala - Kavala International Airport
Rhodes - Rhodes International Airport
Thessaloniki - Thessaloniki Airport
Zakynthos - Zakynthos International Airport

Italy
Catania - Catania–Fontanarossa Airport
Palermo - Palermo Airport

Poland
Gdańsk - Gdańsk Lech Wałęsa Airport
Katowice - Katowice International Airport Base
Lodz - Łódź Władysław Reymont Airport
Poznań - Poznań–Ławica Airport
Warsaw - Warsaw Chopin Airport Base
Wroclaw - Copernicus Airport Wrocław
Bydgoszcz - Bydgoszcz Ignacy Jan Paderewski Airport

Portugal
Madeira - Funchal Airport

Spain
Fuerteventura - Fuerteventura Airport
Las Palmas - Gran Canaria Airport
Palma de Mallorca - Palma de Mallorca Airport
Tenerife - Tenerife South Airport

North America
Cuba
Cayo Coco - Jardines del Rey Airport
Santa Clara - Abel Santamaría Airport
Dominican Republic
Punta Cana - Punta Cana International Airport

Fleet

As of March 2022, the Smartwings Poland fleet consists of the following aircraft:

Smartwings Poland also uses Boeing 737-800 aircraft of their parent company Smartwings to cover its flights.

References

External links

Official website

2012 establishments in Poland
Airlines of Poland
Airlines established in 2012
Charter airlines
Companies based in Warsaw